Rauli may refer to:

 Rauli, a village and railway station in Odisha, India.
 Nothofagus alpina (rauli), a species of plant in the family Fagaceae
 Rauli, a male given name, a Finnish version of the name Ralph. It may refer to:
Rauli Pudas, Finnish pole vaulter
Rauli Raitanen, Finnish ice hockey player
Rauli Somerjoki, Finnish rock singer
Rauli Tuomi (1919–1949), Finnish actor
Rauli Virtanen, Finnish freelance journalist and television producer

Finnish masculine given names